Whitewater Lake is a lake in the city of Sudbury, Ontario. The community of Azilda borders its eastern shore.

The lake is host to a number of amateur fishing tournaments, and it was the site of an annual powerboat racing championship. It is the site of the Sudbury/Azilda Water Aerodrome, which supports a number of aircraft capable of landing on water. During the winter months, a village of ice huts forms on the lake near Azilda's Centennial Park.

Ecology
There are 9 documented species of fish in Whitewater Lake:

Brown Bullhead
Lake Herring (Cisco)
Golden Shiner
Northern Pike
Pumpkinseed
Smallmouth Bass
Walleye
White Sucker
Yellow Perch

There are 22 documented aquatic plants in Whitewater Lake:

Broadleaf arrowhead
Cattail
Duckweed
Flat-stemmed pondweed
Floating arrowhead
Floating-leaved burreed
Floating-leaved pondweed
Hardstem bulrush
Large-fruited burreed
Large-leaved pondweed
Northern water milfoil
Pickerelweed
Richardson's pondweed
Sago pondweed
Slender pondweed
Sweet flag (Calamus)
Water marigold
Water plantain
Water smartweed
White water lily
Wild celery (Tape Grass)
Yellow pond lily

References

External links
Whitewater Lake Water Quality

Lakes of Greater Sudbury